Atherleigh railway station served an area of Leigh in what was then Lancashire, England. It was located on the Bolton and Leigh Railway line which ran from Kenyon Junction to Bolton Great Moor Street.

History

Opened by the London Midland and Scottish Railway to serve local housing estates built after World War 1. The station was located on the west side of the railway at Westbourne Avenue with a connecting footbridge between the two parts of the road.

The station structure was a simple wooden building. There was a platform on each side of the tracks.

The station passed on to the London Midland Region of British Railways on nationalisation in 1948, only to be closed by the British Transport Commission six years later.

After closure

The station is believed to have been used for Rugby League specials and holiday traffic after closure.

By 2015 the station site was buried under the A579 road.

References

Sources

External links
 The station on a 1948 OS map via npe maps
 The closed station on a 1955–61 series OS map via National Library of Scotland
 The station and line via railwaycodes

Disused railway stations in the Metropolitan Borough of Wigan
Former London, Midland and Scottish Railway stations
Railway stations in Great Britain opened in 1935
Railway stations in Great Britain closed in 1954
Buildings and structures in Leigh, Greater Manchester